New York's 7th congressional district is a congressional district for the United States House of Representatives in New York City. It includes parts of Brooklyn and Queens. Democrat Nydia Velázquez represents the district in Congress.

The district includes the Queens neighborhoods of Maspeth, Ridgewood, and Woodhaven; the Brooklyn neighborhoods of Brooklyn Heights, Boerum Hill, Bushwick, Carroll Gardens, Cobble Hill, Dumbo, East New York, East Williamsburg, Greenpoint, Gowanus, Red Hook, Sunset Park, and Williamsburg.

Until 2012, the 7th consisted of parts of Northern Queens and Eastern portions of the Bronx. The Queens portion included the neighborhoods of College Point, East Elmhurst, Jackson Heights and Woodside. The Bronx portion of the district included the neighborhoods of Co-op City, Morris Park, Parkchester, Pelham Bay, and Throgs Neck as well as City Island. Until the latest redistricting in 2022, the 7th also included a portion of Manhattan's Lower East Side.

Like many Congressional districts around the country, the New York Seventh's boundaries were drawn as to link disparate and widely separated neighborhoods with a large percentage of minority voters (see majority-minority districts). While no minority in the district constitutes an absolute majority, the boundaries group together heavily Puerto Rican neighborhoods in the New York City boroughs of Brooklyn and Queens.

Voting

History
2023—:
Parts of Brooklyn and Queens

2013–2023:
Parts of Brooklyn, Manhattan and Queens
1993–2013:
Parts of Bronx, Queens
1953–1993:
Parts of Queens
1913–1953:
Parts of Brooklyn

Various New York districts have been numbered "7" over the years, including areas in New York City and various parts of upstate New York.

List of members representing the district 

The 7th District originally was the south Queens seat in the 1960s and 1970s (now the 6th District) and then became a central Queens seat (essentially the old 8th district) in the 1980s. Following the 1992 remap, much of the old 9th District was added. The 2002 remap placed much of the district in the Bronx, and it now resembles the 1970s era 10th District.

Election results
Note that in New York State electoral politics there are numerous minor parties at various points on the political spectrum. Certain parties will invariably endorse either the Republican or Democratic candidate for every office, hence the state electoral results contain both the party votes, and the final candidate votes (Listed as "Recap").

Historical district boundaries

See also

List of United States congressional districts
New York's congressional districts
United States congressional delegations from New York

Notes

References

 Congressional Biographical Directory of the United States 1774–present
 2004 House election data Clerk of the House of Representatives
 2002 House election data "
 2000 House election data "
 1998 House election data "
 1996 House election data "

07
Constituencies established in 1793
1793 establishments in New York (state)